Lawton House may refer to:
Chauncey N. Lawton House South Bend, Indiana, listed on the NRHP in St. Joseph County, Indiana
A house of the Henry Ware Lawton family, such as 1511 S. 4th Street in Old Louisville, Kentucky, or The Beeches.  These were models for The Waltons television series.
George H. Lawton House, Colonie, New York, listed on the NRHP in Albany County, New York
Wildcliff, also known as Cyrus Lawton House, in New Rochelle, New York, in Westchester County
Robert Lawton Jones House, Tulsa, Oklahoma, listed on the NRHP in Tulsa County
Lawton-Almy-Hall Farm, Portsmouth, Rhode Island, listed on the NRHP in Newton County
John Lawton House, Estill, South Carolina, listed on the NRHP in Hampton County
Lawton House, also known as Home Hill, in Falls Church, Virginia

See also
Lawton Hall, Cheshire, England